Suixi may refer to the following places in China:

 Suixi County, Anhui (濉溪县)
Suixi Town (濉溪镇), seat of Suixi County, Anhui
 Suixi County, Guangdong (遂溪县)